is a public museum that opened in Shimonoseki, Yamaguchi Prefecture, Japan, in 2016.

History

Collection

See also

 List of Historic Sites of Japan (Yamaguchi)
 Yamaguchi Prefectural Museum
 Shimonoseki City Archaeological Museum
 Shimonoseki City Art Museum

References

External links
 Shimonoseki City Museum of History

Shimonoseki
Museums in Yamaguchi Prefecture
History museums in Japan
Museums established in 2016
2016 establishments in Japan